The 139th Indiana Infantry Regiment served in the Union Army between June 5, 1864, and September 29, 1865, during the American Civil War.

Service 
The regiment was organized at Indianapolis, Indiana, and mustered in on June 5, 1864. It was ordered to Tennessee and Alabama for railroad guard duty, until late September 1865. The regiment was mustered out on September 29, 1865. During its service the regiment lost eleven men to disease.

See also
 List of Indiana Civil War regiments

References

Bibliography 
 Dyer, Frederick H. (1959). A Compendium of the War of the Rebellion. New York and London. Thomas Yoseloff, Publisher. .

Units and formations of the Union Army from Indiana
1864 establishments in Indiana
Military units and formations established in 1865
Military units and formations disestablished in 1865
1865 disestablishments in the United States